William Francis "Bill" Fogarty (1 June 1922 – 13 July 2001) was an Australian politician.

He was born in Kingsville, and served in the Royal Australian Navy from 1940 to 1946 as a signalman. From 1946 to 1954 he was a metalworker, subsequently working as an official in the Cold Storage and Meat Preserving Employees' Union from 1954 to 1972; he was federal secretary from 1965 to 1973. On 9 June 1945 he married Olive Mildred McIntosh; they had two children. From 1960 to 1972 he was a Footscray City Councillor, serving as mayor from 1963 to 1964. In 1973 he was elected to the Victorian Legislative Assembly as the Labor member for Sunshine, where he became the parliamentary spokesman on agriculture until 1982. He retired from politics in 1988 and died in Spotswood in 2001.

References

1922 births
2001 deaths
Members of the Victorian Legislative Assembly
Australian Labor Party members of the Parliament of Victoria
20th-century Australian politicians
Royal Australian Navy personnel of World War II
People from the City of Maribyrnong
Politicians from Melbourne
Military personnel from Melbourne